Olajumoke Olufunmilola Adenowo (born 16 October 1968) is a Nigerian architect.  She started her own architecture and interior design firm AD Consulting in 1994.

Early life and education

Adenowo was born in Ibadan, Oyo State, Nigeria. Her parents were both professors, one of whom taught history and the other criminology. She lived on campus at Obafemi Awolowo University, which was designed by Bauhaus-trained architect Arieh Sharon between 1962 and 1972. Living in, and eventually studying at the university encouraged her approach to architecture at a young age.

At 14, she enrolled in Obafemi Awolowo University, where she graduated with a Bachelor of Science with Honours in Architecture at age 19. As an undergraduate, she won the prize for Best Student Design. She obtained her Master of Science in Architecture, with distinction, from the same university in 1991.

She is an alumnna of the Harvard Kennedy School (2019), the Yale School of Management (2016), the Lagos Business School Chief Executive Programme (2002) and The IESE Business School at the University of Navarra in Barcelona, Spain (2005).

Adenowo has stated that her interest in architecture was ignited by visits to Paris and the Palais de Versailles as a young child, as well as living on the Obafemi Awolowo University campus. These inspired her design philosophy - the core lesson being that in its functionality, architecture must be sensitive to its climatic, technological, infrastructural and physical contexts.

Career

Architecture 
After graduating from university, Adenowo was hired as an Assistant Architect at Towry Coker Associates. She then practised as an architect in Lagos at Femi Majekodunmi Associates. She worked on the Federal Ministry of Finance project in Abuja at the age of 23.

At age 25, Adenowo founded her boutique architecture and interior design firm, AD Consulting, in 1994. Since its inception, AD Consulting has been involved in the design and construction of more than 70 projects. These include Nigerian government buildings, private residences, healthcare facilities, industrial campuses, and corporate and financial institutions. AD's clients include Coca-Cola and L’Oreal.

CNN described her as "Africa's Starchitect" and The Guardian (Nigeria) has described her as "the face of Architecture in Nigeria". In 2018, she was recognised by the Royal Institute of British Architects (RIBA) as one of the inspirational women in architecture today.

Adenowo has been featured in the architectural journal Architectural Record.

Adenowo's portfolio includes a host of multi-national and Nigerian clients, including Coca-Cola, L’Oreal, The Nigerian Stock Exchange, Access Bank plc and Guaranty Trust Bank

In 2019, Olajumoke Adenowo was appointed a Visiting Professor at the Technische Universitat Munchen (TUM) in Germany. She was honoured as a Laureate and Guest Scientist at the Chair of Theory, History of Architecture and Art & Design arms of the university's Department of Architecture. This programme is established in collaboration with the Bavarian Ministry of Education.

Other endeavours
In parallel to founding AD Consulting, Adenowo also founded and ran Advantage Energy, an oil and gas services firm. She is an Associate Member of the Chartered Institute of Arbitrators and a member of the African Leadership Network.

As a public speaker, Adenowo has lectured on the arts, architecture, gender issues, women's empowerment, and entrepreneurial activities in Africa. She has spoken at the Global Women's Forum and Harvard Business School (African Business Club). She hosts a syndicated radio show on leadership called "Voice of Change". She has been featured by international media outlets such as CNN and Fortune.

Business
 Cartier Women's Initiative Awards - Jury Member - 2018 
 Vocational Training and Professional Development Academy (VPDA), Director - 2018
 Hamilton Prep School, Director - 2018
 British School of Lome, Director - 2012
 Fountain Holdings Limited, Director - 2011

Philanthropy
Adenowo has several philanthropic ventures. In 1999, she founded the Awesome Treasures Foundation (ATF), a UN-recognised, faith-based NGO in Lagos, Nigeria. The foundation has a mission to raise 1,000 leaders by 2030, working especially women and young people.

The majority of her foundation's programming focuses on disadvantaged women and children. ATF runs Camp Dawn, an educational camp, to address the education gap for inner-city kids. It also manages Awesome Princesses, which cares for young girls from the slums of Lagos who are at risk of sexual abuse and HIV/AIDS by supplying medical screenings and educational interventions. Awesome Treasures closely mentors women for transnational leadership and entrepreneurship through vocational training, business classes and leadership training that takes place across Nigeria. In its first 15 years, 70,000 people have attended ATF leadership summits.

Public appearances
Recognized as a thought leader on architecture, the Arts, leadership and gender issues, she speaks regularly at international summits and conferences, including the McKinsey & Company Leadership Forum, the Global Women's Forum, SOLVE at MIT, the Harvard Business School (African Business Club), Cambridge University (African Society), Haust Der Kunst (Munich), the Institute of Directors, the New African Woman Forum and many other platforms.

Adenowo hosts a radio show on a syndicated weekly programme on leadership called the Voice of Change.

Awards
Her awards include: The Rare Gems Award in conjunction with the United Nations Information Centre and the Women's Optimum Development Foundation (WODEF), for her work with women empowerment; the International Alliance for Women World of Difference 100 Award; the International Property Awards (Best Public Service Architecture, 2012); the African Property Awards (Best Mixed-Use Architecture; Best Office Architecture and Best Public Service Architecture, 2013); the IDEA Awards (Best Commercial Designer 2012; Best interior Architect 2013); the Ekiti State Merit Awards, 2014; IDEA Awards (Best Institutional Architect 2014) and the Cambridge African Society Award.

In 1991, Adenowo was included in the "Who Will Be Who in The 21st Century" by the International Biographical Centre in Cambridge, UK. She is a Vital Voices Lead Fellow and a member of Global Philanthropy Forum, the African Philanthropy Forum and the African Leadership Network.

She has also been honoured as an Ambassador of Excellence for outstanding achievements in architecture and women's development by her alma mater.

Adenowo received the New African Woman in Business Award and was also nominated for the West African Business Woman of The Year Award at the CNBC All Africa Business Leaders Awards in 2014. She was recognized as one of Nigeria's 100 most Influential Nigerians. She also was named as one of the 100 Most Inspiring Women in Nigeria, one of Africa's Most Powerful 10 Women in Business by AFK Insider and Africa's Most Inspiring Business Woman by the La Batisseurs Des Economie De L’Afrique.

She is a fellow of the Nigerian Institute of Architects and was a jury member of the Cartier Women's Initiative Awards. She was featured in the Hall of Fame during Black History Month by the University of West England, Bristol.

Current work and projects  
Adenowo's first major project was at the age of 24 under the leadership of her Principal Chief Femi Majekodunmi of Femi Majekodunmi and Associates. She designed the Federal Ministry of Finance Building, Abuja, in the Federal Capital of Nigeria. Other work includes:

 Guiding Light Assembly 
 Kinshasa (DRC) City Centre redevelopment 
 GTBank High Networth Individual Centre
 Access Bank Youth Banking Brand environment redevelopment 
 VGC – Private Residence
 AD Studio 
 Rain Oil 
 OAU Senate Building 
 Calabar Church

Personal life
She is married to Olukorede Adenowo. They have two sons.

Published works
Beyond My Dreams; 1 September 2019.
 Lifespring: The Mother's Prayer manual (Revised and Updated Edition). AuthorHouse; 5 July 2012. 
 The Mysterious Seed: Powerful Secrets of Financial Increase. AuthorHouse; January 2013. .
 Designed for Marriage. Awesome Treasures Foundation; 2013. 
 Covenant Forces. Sovereign Flame Publishing.
 Child of Destiny. Sovereign Flame Publishing; 1996.

See also
 List of Nigerian architects

References

Further reading
 "CNN celebrates Nigerian female architect: Olajumoke Adenowo". Nigerian Tribune. December 13, 2014.
 Africa's Female Philanthropists Are Emerging From the Sidelines
 Architectural Record - Newsmaker: Olajumoke Adenowo
 "Adenowo: Branding Nigeria Through Architecture", Sunday Magazine, The Guardian (Nigeria), 15 December 2013. Accessed 13 January 2013.
 "I love creating things, not just buildings", The Nation, 18 March 2012. Accessed 24 December 2012.
 AD Consulting: Principal Partner. Accessed 24 December 2012.
 About Me Adenowo's personal website.
 "Olajumoke Adenowo On The Cover Of TW Magazine’s June Edition", Today's Woman website, 12 June 2013. Accessed 13 January 2013.
 Kemi Adejumobi (February 13, 2015). "Olajumoke Adenowo, Nigeria’s star architect -CNN". Businessday. Retrieved March 9, 2015.
 I Compete Against Myself—Olajumoke Adenowo Sun News Online. 21 December 2013.
 "Designed For Marriage", Olajumoke Adenowo Tackles Serious Marriage Issues, Check Out Photos From Book Launch Onobello.com, 12 July 2013.
 "I compete against myself - Olajumoke Adenowo". NewsFetchers. Retrieved May 2014.
 Those who Inspire Nigeria.
 “Who will be who in the 21st century” (young achievers section) by the International Biographical Centre Cambridge, England
 Women in Architecture "It is not a man's world" Olajumoke Adenowo covers May 2016 International Edition of New African Woman Magazine

External links 

1968 births
Living people
Nigerian women architects
Nigerian writers
Yoruba women architects
Obafemi Awolowo University alumni
Businesspeople from Ibadan
Nigerian women in business
21st-century Nigerian businesspeople
Yoruba women in business
Nigerian Christians
Nigerian women company founders
Nigerian motivational speakers
Nigerian businesspeople in the oil industry
Nigerian real estate businesspeople
Nigerian Christian writers
Nigerian interior designers
Nigerian women writers
Yoruba women writers
20th-century Nigerian architects
21st-century Nigerian architects
Yale School of Management alumni
Lagos Business School alumni
21st-century Nigerian businesswomen